The Dadong Arts Center is an art center in Fengshan District, Kaohsiung, Taiwan.

History
The construction of the center started in September 2008. It was completed in March 2012.

Architecture
The center was designed by MAYU architects, de Architekten Cie and constructed by Arup and Tien-Hun Engineering Consultant Inc. It consists of theater, exhibition center, library and education center.

Transportation
The center is accessible from Dadong Station of Kaohsiung MRT.

See also
 List of tourist attractions in Taiwan

References

External links

  

2012 establishments in Taiwan
Art centers in Kaohsiung
Buildings and structures completed in 2012